The Bob Seger Collection was a compilation album released in 1979, in Australia and New Zealand only.

Track listing

Side one
 "Night Moves"
 "Mainstreet"
 "Let It Rock" (studio version)
 "Leaning on My Dream"
 "Ship of Fools"
 "Still the Same"

Side two
 "Katmandu"
 "Mongrel Too"
 "Hollywood Nights"
 "Travelin' Man"
 "Get Out of Denver"
 "We've Got Tonight"

Charts

References

1979 compilation albums
Bob Seger compilation albums
Capitol Records compilation albums